Yegor Alyoshin (born February 6, 1992) is a Russian professional ice hockey Forward. He is currently playing with Buran Voronezh in the Supreme Hockey League (VHL).

Alyoshin made his Kontinental Hockey League debut playing with Atlant Moscow Oblast during the 2014–15 KHL season.

References

External links

1992 births
Living people
Atlant Moscow Oblast players
Buran Voronezh players
Rubin Tyumen players
Russian ice hockey forwards
Toros Neftekamsk players
Universiade medalists in ice hockey
Universiade gold medalists for Russia
Competitors at the 2013 Winter Universiade
Competitors at the 2015 Winter Universiade